The 2015 Old Dominion Monarchs football team represented Old Dominion University in the 2015 NCAA Division I FBS football season. They were led by seventh-year head coach Bobby Wilder and played their home games at Foreman Field at S. B. Ballard Stadium in Norfolk, Virginia. They were members of the East Division of Conference USA. 2015 was the first year Old Dominion was a full member of the NCAA Division I Football Bowl Subdivision (FBS) and eligible for postseason play. They finished the season 5–7, 3–5 in C-USA play to finish in a three-way tie for fourth place in the East Division.

Previous season
The Monarchs finished the 2014 season 6–6 overall and 4–4 in conference play. Old Dominion's biggest win and upset was against their first conference play opponent and 2013 C–USA Champions, Rice by 45–42. Old Dominion earned their sixth win of the 2014 season by defeating Florida Atlantic at the end of the season but was not bowl eligible due to the program's transition from FCS to FBS.

Personnel

Coaching staff

Roster

Source:

Schedule
Old Dominion announced their 2015 football schedule on February 2, 2015. The 2015 schedule consist of seven home and five away games in the regular season. The Monarchs will host CUSA foes Charlotte, Florida Atlantic, UTEP, and Western Kentucky (WKU), and will travel to Florida International (FIU), Marshall, Southern Miss, and UTSA.

Schedule Source:

Game summaries

Eastern Michigan

Norfolk State

NC State

Appalachian State

Marshall

Charlotte

FIU

Western Kentucky

UTSA

UTEP

Southern Miss

Florida Atlantic

References

Old Dominion
Old Dominion Monarchs football seasons
Old Dominion Monarchs football